Lignerolles Airfield is an abandoned World War II military airfield near the commune of Lignerolles in  the Normandy region of northern France.

Located to the south and east of Lignerolles, the United States Army Air Force established a temporary airfield on 6 July 1944, shortly after the Allied landings in France. The airfield was constructed by the IX Engineering Command, 820th Engineer Aviation Battalion.

History
Known as Advanced Landing Ground "A-12", the airfield consisted of a single  Prefabricated Hessian Surfacing runway. In addition, tents were used for billeting and also for support facilities; an access road was built to the existing road infrastructure; a dump for supplies, ammunition, and gasoline drums, along with a drinkable water and minimal electrical grid for communications and station lighting.

The fighter planes from Lignerolles flew support missions during the Allied invasion of Normandy, patrolling roads in front of the beachhead; strafing German military vehicles and dropping bombs on gun emplacements, anti-aircraft artillery and concentrations of German troops in Normandy and Brittany when spotted.

In the beginning of September 1944, 34 Wing (RAF) was moved from RAF Northolt to Lignerolles.  The wing operated two photographic reconnaissance squadrons from the airfield in support of the Canadian Army.

After the Americans and British moved east into Central France with the advancing Allied Armies, the airfield was left un-garrisoned and used for resupply and casualty evacuation.   It was closed on 4 November 1944 and the land returned to agricultural use.

Major units assigned
 362d Fighter Group 2 July - 10 August 1944
 377th (E4), 378th (G8), 379th (B6) Fighter Squadrons (P-47)
 365th Fighter Group 15 August - 3 September 1944
 386th (D5), 387th (B4), 388th (C4) Fighter Squadrons (P-47D)
 34 Wing (Royal Air Force), September 1944
 69 Squadron (MJ) (Spitfires XI), 140 Squadron (ZW) (Mosquito XVI)

Current use
Today there is little or no physical evidence of the airfield's existence.
A memorial to the men and units that were stationed at Lignerolles was placed at the site of the former airfield.  It is located along a path that starts from the D13 at the place called The Hodam.

See also

 Advanced Landing Ground

References

External links

 A-12 Memorial

World War II airfields in France
Airfields of the United States Army Air Forces in France
Airports established in 1944